Balkrishna Akotkar (born 1 July 1937) is an Indian long-distance runner. He competed in the marathon at the 1964 Summer Olympics.

He stood 33rd in the marathon event at the 1964 Olympics. Post his retirement from sports, he has been monumental in development of future athletes. He has headed a committee for the selection of male and female athletes to represent Maharashtra state in the National Cross Country Championship

References

External links
 

1937 births
Living people
Athletes (track and field) at the 1964 Summer Olympics
Indian male long-distance runners
Indian male marathon runners
Olympic athletes of India
Place of birth missing (living people)